The 2018 season was the Baltimore Ravens' 23rd in the National Football League (NFL), their 11th under head coach John Harbaugh, and their 17th and final season under general manager Ozzie Newsome.

In Week 6, the Ravens set a franchise record, sacking Tennessee Titans quarterback Marcus Mariota 11 times in a 21–0 win.

After struggling to a 4–5 start, the Ravens went on a 6–1 run to finish 10–6 on the season, thanks to the emergence of rookie quarterback Lamar Jackson, who replaced longtime QB Joe Flacco due to injury. The Ravens clinched the AFC North after defeating the Cleveland Browns in Week 17, reaching the playoffs for the first time since 2014 and winning their division for the first time since 2012; they also finished the regular season ranked first in total defense. However they lost to the Los Angeles Chargers 23–17 in the Wild Card playoffs, which was the first time since 2006 that the Ravens went one-and-done and their first Wild Card playoff loss since 2003.

Draft

Draft trades

The Ravens traded their second- and fourth-round selections (52nd and 125th) and a second-round selection in the 2019 NFL Draft to Philadelphia in exchange for their first- and fourth-round selections (32nd and 132nd).
The Ravens traded their first- and fifth-round selections (16th and 154th) to Buffalo in exchange for Buffalo's first and third round selections (22nd and 65th).
The Ravens traded their first- and sixth-round selections (22nd and 215th) to Tennessee in exchange for Tennessee's first- and fourth-round selections (25th and 125th).
The Ravens traded their third-round selection (75th) to Kansas City in exchange for Kansas City's third- and fourth-round selections (86th and 122nd).
The Ravens traded their fifth-round selection (152nd) to Tennessee in exchange for Tennessee's fifth- and sixth-round selections (162nd and 215th).
The Ravens traded this third-round selection (65th) to Oakland in exchange for Oakland's third-, fifth-, and sixth-round selections (75th, 152nd, and 212th).
The Ravens traded a seventh-round selection (238th) to Arizona in exchange for center Tony Bergstrom, the pick later traded back to the Ravens.
The Ravens were awarded a sixth-round compensatory pick (215th overall); later traded to Tennessee, then traded back to the Ravens.

Staff

Final roster

Preseason

Schedule
On February 13, the NFL announced that the Ravens will play the Chicago Bears in the Pro Football Hall of Fame Game on Thursday, August 2, at the Tom Benson Hall of Fame Stadium in Canton, Ohio.

The remainder of the Ravens' preseason opponents and schedule were announced on April 11, 2018.

Regular season

Schedule
The Ravens' 2018 schedule was announced on April 19.

Note: Intra-division opponents are in bold text.

Game summaries

Week 1: Baltimore Ravens 47, Buffalo Bills 3

In a blowout win over the Bills, Ravens QB Joe Flacco passed for three touchdowns before being relieved by rookie Lamar Jackson, while Bills QB Nathan Peterman was benched for rookie Josh Allen after posting a 0.0 passer rating.

Week 2: Cincinnati Bengals 34, Baltimore Ravens 23

Week 3: Baltimore Ravens 27, Denver Broncos 14

Week 4: Baltimore Ravens 26, Pittsburgh Steelers 14

Week 5: Cleveland Browns 12, Baltimore Ravens 9 (OT)

Week 6: Baltimore Ravens 21, Tennessee Titans 0

Week 7: New Orleans Saints 24, Baltimore Ravens 23

Week 8: Carolina Panthers 36, Baltimore Ravens 21

Week 9: Pittsburgh Steelers 23, Baltimore Ravens 16

After 10 years with the team, this would become Joe Flacco’s final start and last game as a Raven as he suffered a hip injury and was replaced by Lamar Jackson, who went on to start the final 7 games of the season. Flacco was ultimately traded to the Denver Broncos during the off-season.

Week 11: Baltimore Ravens 24, Cincinnati Bengals 21

On his first drive as the starting quarterback for the Ravens, Lamar Jackson orchestrated an 11 play, 75 yard game winning drive with Alex Collins running the ball in for a touchdown.  During the drive Jackson did not throw a single pass but rushed  5 times for 46 yards.

Week 12: Baltimore Ravens 34, Oakland Raiders 17

Week 13: Baltimore Ravens 26, Atlanta Falcons 16

Week 14: Kansas City Chiefs 27, Baltimore Ravens 24 (OT)

Week 15: Baltimore Ravens 20, Tampa Bay Buccaneers 12

Week 16: Baltimore Ravens 22, Los Angeles Chargers 10

Week 17: Baltimore Ravens 26, Cleveland Browns 24

Similar to last season, the Ravens' playoff hopes was decided on a 4th down in the waning seconds of the game. Browns QB Baker Mayfield made a quick throw that was picked by Ravens LB C.J. Mosley to seal the game for Baltimore, clinching them their first division title in 6 years and making the playoffs.

Standings

Division

Conference

Postseason

Schedule

Game summaries

Wild Card Round: Los Angeles Chargers 23, Baltimore Ravens 17

The Chargers recorded six sacks, jumped out to a 23–3 lead and halted a late Ravens rally, forcing Lamar Jackson to fumble on the final drive to earn a trip to New England.

On the Ravens' second possession of the game, Chargers defensive end Melvin Ingram forced a fumble from Kenneth Dixon that was recovered by safety Adrian Phillips, giving Los Angeles the ball on the Baltimore 14-yard line. Three plays later, Michael Badgley kicked a 21-yard field goal to give Los Angeles a 3–0 lead. Then the Chargers' defense forced a punt, which Desmond King returned 42 yards to the Ravens' 42-yard line, setting up a 53-yard Badgley field goal that increased their lead to 6–0. Early in the second quarter, Phillips intercepted a pass from Jackson to give the Chargers a first down on the Ravens' 44-yard line. From there, they drove 27 yards to go up 9–0 on Badgley's third field goal. Following another Ravens punt, Los Angeles drove 53 yards in 12 plays to score on Badgley's fourth field goal on the last play of the half, giving them a 12–0 lead.

King returned the second half kickoff 72 yards to the Ravens' 35-yard line, but this time the Chargers failed to score when Badgley's field goal attempt was blocked by Za'Darius Smith. After a Ravens punt, linebacker Patrick Onwuasor forced a fumble from Chargers tight end Virgil Green that was recovered by linebacker C. J. Mosley on the Los Angeles 21-yard line. This set up Justin Tucker's 33-yard field goal, cutting the score to 12–3 with 8:34 left in the third quarter. At the end of Los Angeles' next possession, the Ravens got another scoring opportunity when Javorius Allen blocked Donnie Jones's punt, resulting in Baltimore taking over on the Chargers' 40-yard line; they only managed to gain 4 yards with their next three plays and Tucker's 50-yard field goal attempt was wide right. Los Angeles then drove 60 yards in 10 plays, featuring a 28-yard completion from Philip Rivers to Mike Williams on the Ravens' 15-yard line. On the next play, Melvin Gordon ran the ball 14 yards to the 1-yard line. The Ravens managed to keep Los Angeles out of the end zone for the next three plays, but Gordon scored with a 4th down 1-yard touchdown run on the first play of the 4th quarter; Rivers completed a pass to Williams for a two-point conversion, giving the Chargers a 20–3 lead.

A sack by Ingram on the Ravens' ensuing drive forced them to punt from their 14-yard line and Sam Koch's 31-yard kick gave the Chargers good field position on the Ravens' 45-yard line. Los Angeles then drove 16 yards, including a 9-yard scramble by Rivers on 3rd-and-8, to score on Badgley's 5th field goal, from 47 yards, that gave them a 23–3 lead. Taking the ball back with 9:02 left, Baltimore drove 75 yards in eight plays, including Jackson's 29-yard completion to Willie Snead on 4th-and-11. On the next play, Jackson threw a 31-yard touchdown pass to receiver Michael Crabtree, making the score 23–10. The Chargers recovered Baltimore's ensuing onside kick attempt, but still had to punt after three plays. Baltimore went on to drive 85 yards in 12 plays, the longest a 39-yard completion from Jackson to Dixon. On the last play, Jackson threw a 6-yard touchdown pass to Crabtree, narrowing their gap to 23–17 with 2:06 left. Baltimore then forced a punt with 45 seconds to go, giving them one last chance to drive for a winning touchdown, but Chargers linebacker Uchenna Nwosu forced a fumble while sacking Jackson and Ingram recovered it to give Los Angeles the victory.

Rivers completed 22-of-32 passes for 160 yards and rushed for 15 yards. Ingram finished the game with seven tackles (two for a loss of yards), two sacks, a forced fumble and a fumble recovery. Phillips had five tackles (three solo), an interception and a fumble recovery. King returned a kickoff for 72 yards and had four punt returns for 46 yards. Jackson completed 14-of-29 passes for 194 yards, with two touchdowns and an interception; he was also Baltimore's leading rusher with 9 carries for 54 yards. Onwausor had seven tackles (six solo), a sack and a forced fumble.

References

External links
 

Baltimore
Baltimore Ravens seasons
Baltimore Ravens
AFC North championship seasons
2010s in Baltimore